Sarad is an unmanned aerial vehicle (UAV) designed by a group of Mechanical engineers (Sarad group) at Imam Khomeini International University.

Sarad could rank second in 2nd National UAV Design and Construction Contest held in Sharif University of Technology among 46 contestants from state and Azad universities.

See also
Unmanned aerial vehicle
List of unmanned aerial vehicles
Unmanned Aircraft System
Aerospace engineering
Imam Khomeini International University

References

Unmanned aerial vehicles of Iran
Aircraft manufactured in Iran